Daylight is a 2005 album by Jimmy Ibbotson. Ibbotson is a former member of the Nitty Gritty Dirt Band.

Track listing

"No Shoestrings on Louise" (Elton John, Bernie Taupin)
"Mission Temple Fireworks Stand" (Brother Paul Thorn)
"Daylight" (Jimmy Ibbotson)
"Zoom" (Jimmy Ibbotson)
"Call At Dawn" (Jimmy Ibbotson)
"Becky And The Baby" (Jimmy Ibbotson)
"Happy Hopin' To You" (Jimmy Ibbotson)
"Noggy Noggin'" (traditional)
"Back To Back" (Jimmy Ibbotson)
"One Love" (Bob Marley)

Personnel
Jimmy Ibbotson - guitar, bass, mandolin, keyboards, flute, vocals

References

2005 albums
Jimmy Ibbotson albums